Sinivie Boltic (born 2 July 1982 in Famgbe, Nigeria) is a Nigerian wrestler who competed in the freestyle 96 kg event at the 2012 Summer Olympics. He was the flag bearer of Nigeria during the opening ceremony.

References

External links
 

1982 births
Nigerian male sport wrestlers
Living people
Wrestlers at the 2012 Summer Olympics
Olympic wrestlers of Nigeria
Wrestlers at the 2002 Commonwealth Games
Wrestlers at the 2010 Commonwealth Games
Wrestlers at the 2014 Commonwealth Games
Commonwealth Games medallists in wrestling
Commonwealth Games gold medallists for Nigeria
Commonwealth Games bronze medallists for Nigeria
Competitors at the 2019 African Games
African Games medalists in wrestling
African Games silver medalists for Nigeria
African Wrestling Championships medalists
21st-century Nigerian people
Medallists at the 2002 Commonwealth Games
Medallists at the 2010 Commonwealth Games
Medallists at the 2014 Commonwealth Games